is a Japanese publishing company known for its leading monthly magazine Bungeishunjū. The company was founded by Kan Kikuchi in 1923. It grants the annual Akutagawa Prize, one of the most prestigious literary awards in Japan, as well as the annual Naoki Prize for popular novelists. It also granted (from 1955 to 2001) the annual Bungeishunjū Manga Award for achievement in the manga and illustration fields. It is headquartered in Chiyoda, Tokyo.

The company publishes , the weekly , and the sports magazine Number, which represent public opinion of literary, political, and sport-journalistic culture, respectively. The Bunshun, in particular, has come to be known for litigation involving freedom of speech issues, particularly alleged privacy violations and defamation; see, for example, Mitsuo Kagawa.

List of magazines
The magazines published by Bungeishunjū include:
 (published monthly) 
 (published monthly) 
 (published weekly)
 (monthly literary issue)
 (women's quality)
 (op-ed magazine)

Book series
The book series published by Bungeishunjū include:
 Bunshun Bunko - a "series of literary works"

Company history
Bungeishunjū was founded in 1923 by writer Kan Kikuchi. The company was disbanded in March 1946 but was reestablished in June of the same year.

In February 1995 the magazine , a 250,000-circulation monthly published by Bungei Shunju, ran a Holocaust denial article by physician Masanori Nishioka which stated:

The "Holocaust" is a fabrication. There were no execution gas chambers in Auschwitz or in any other concentration camp. Today, what are displayed as "gas chambers" at the remains of the Auschwitz camp in Poland are a post-war fabrication by the Polish communist regime or by the Soviet Union, which controlled the country. Not once, neither at Auschwitz nor in any territory controlled by the Germans during the Second World War, was there "mass murder of Jews" in "gas chambers."

The Los Angeles-based Simon Wiesenthal Center instigated a boycott of Bungei Shunju advertisers, including Volkswagen, Mitsubishi, and Cartier. Within days, Bungei Shunju shut down Marco Polo and its editor, Kazuyoshi Hanada, quit, as did the president of Bungei Shunju, Kengo Tanaka.

Contributors and editors

References

External links
 Official site  
 Blog Essay 

 
Book publishing companies in Tokyo
Magazine publishing companies in Tokyo
Publishing companies established in 1923
1923 establishments in Japan